Lavaux is a region in the canton of Vaud in Switzerland, in the district of Lavaux-Oron. Lavaux consists of 830 hectares of terraced vineyards that stretch for about 30 km along the south-facing northern shores of Lake Geneva.

Although there is some evidence that vines were grown in the area in Roman times, the actual vine terraces can be traced back to the 11th century, when Benedictine and Cistercian monasteries controlled the area. It benefits from a temperate climate, but the southern aspect of the terraces with the reflection of the sun in the lake and the stone walls gives a mediterranean character to the region. The main wine grape variety grown here is the Chasselas.

World Heritage site 

Under cantonal law, the vineyards of Lavaux are protected from development. Since July 2007, Lavaux is a UNESCO World Heritage Sites.

Since 2016, the vineyards of Lavaux are not treated with synthetic pesticides any more.

Hiking trail 

There are many hikes possible through the vineyards of Lavaux. There is a hiking trail ("Terrasses de Lavaux"), going from Saint-Saphorin to Lutry, recommended by the Tourism Office of Switzerland.

Legal protection 

In 1977, the voters of the Canton of Vaud accepted (55%) the cantonal popular initiative "Save Lavaux" Consequently, in 1979, a law was made to protect Lavaux (Loi sur le plan de protection de Lavaux).

In 2003, the new constitution of the Canton of Vaud came into force but did not contain the article about the protection of Lavaux. A second popular initiative "Save Lavaux" was launched to re-introduce it and was accepted in 2005 by 81% of voters.

In 2009, Franz Weber launched a third initiative "Save Lavaux" to reduce the possibilities to build new buildings in Lavaux, which was rejected on 19 May 2014 by 68% of voters. The counter-initiative of the regional government (Council of State of Vaud) was accepted by 68% of voters (strengthening the protection but less strictly than the initiative of Franz Weber).

Influences and tributes 

 Lavaux is the name of a song by Prince, on his album 20Ten (2010).
 In 2011, the Swiss Post issued three special stamps celebrating the region of Lavaux.

Gallery

Notes and references

External links 

 
 
 Lavaux Vineyard Terraces hiking trail
 Lavaux Vinorama

Geography of Switzerland
Wine regions of Switzerland
Geography of the canton of Vaud
World Heritage Sites in Switzerland